El Alia is a town and commune in the Bizerte Governorate, Tunisia.

It was the ancient Uzalis in the Roman province of Africa Proconsularis, which became a Christian bishopric that is included in the Catholic Church's list of titular sees.

It is not to be confused with El Alia Cemetery, which is in Algeria.

History
This city has existed since Roman times. In antiquity, its name was Uzalis while its current name comes from its founder in the Middle Ages: Ali El Balight. There are still some Roman ruins scattered throughout the city.

The population is largely composed of descendants of Andalusians who fled Spain after the Christian reconquest. Andalusian architecture has left its mark on the ancient city situated at the top of the hill (Djebel H'kima). The new city developed in the plains surrounding the ancient city. Monuments such as the Great Mosque and some mausoleums survived the modernization of the city, the walls and gates surrounding the old city having been destroyed at the beginning of the 20th century.

See also
List of cities in Tunisia

References

Populated places in Bizerte Governorate
Communes of Tunisia
Catholic titular sees in Africa
Tunisia geography articles needing translation from French Wikipedia